Shepperton railway station is a passenger station serving Shepperton, a small suburban  town in Surrey, England.

The station and all trains serving it are operated by South Western Railway. The station is a terminus with one platform operational and a large station/office building.

Ian Allan Publishing has its offices at the western end of the station, and the company bought the Pullman car "Malaga" for hospitality, sited near the terminus buffers.

History 

The Shepperton branch opened to passengers on 1 November 1864. The original scheme intended that it would extend to a terminus on the Middlesex bank of the River Thames just east of Chertsey Bridge, but this plan was abandoned in 1862. The curve linking Fulwell and Teddington initially opened only to freight on 1 July 1894 and first carried passengers on 1 June 1901.  The line was electrified on 30 January 1916.

Journey times fell from 1916 on electrification of services and were on a timetable which was semi-fast (semi-stopping) before becoming entirely stopping later. 

The original terminus included cattle sidings and a turntable (removed August 1942).

Accidents and incidents 
On 21 April 1982, a British Rail Class 508 (508031) train was running the 06:34 service from London Waterloo to Shepperton crashed, demolishing barriers and a wall. The train also slid into some new pedestrian crossing lights, rendering them unusable. The crash was initially believed to be the result of braking tests the previous night, which involved applying grease to the tracks, and that the grease may not have been sufficiently cleaned off, however it was later found that the train's brakes were faulty.

Services 

The weekday service at the station can be summarised hourly as:

2 trains to London Waterloo via Kingston.
2 trains from London Waterloo via Kingston.
one extra very early and three extra 07.00 to 08.00 trains to Waterloo via Twickenham.
Three extra trains from Waterloo via Twickenham (17.40 to 18.45).

The Saturday service is as on other weekdays without the extra services routed via Twickenham. On Sundays the service is hourly.

The ticket office opens infrequently, but a ticket machine is provided.

Connections
Bus routes 400, 458, 555 and 557 serve the station. All are operated on behalf of Surrey County Council.

Notes and references
Notes 
  
References

External links 

Borough of Spelthorne
Railway stations in Surrey
Former London and South Western Railway stations
Railway stations in Great Britain opened in 1864
Railway stations served by South Western Railway